The T297/298 Beijing-Mudanjiang Through Train (Chinese:T297/298次北京到牡丹江特快速列车) is a railway running from Beijing to Mudanjiang. It carries express passenger trains for the Harbin Railway Bureau It hosts the Mudanjiang passenger segment responsible for passenger transport. Mudanjiang originates on the Beijing train. 25K Type Passenger trains run along the Jingqin Railway, Shenshan Railway, Hada Railway and Binsui Railway across Heilongjiang, Jilin, Liaoning, Hebei, Tianjin, Beijing and other areas. The line covers 1566 km. The Beijing railway station to Mudanjiang railway station route runs 19 hours and 39 minutes. Mudanjiang to Beijing runs 19 hours and 15 minutes.

Carriages

Locomotives

Timetable

See also
T17/18 Beijing-Mudanjiang Through Train

References

Passenger rail transport in China
Rail transport in Beijing
Rail transport in Heilongjiang